Laurence Blades (19 August 1916 – 10 February 2006) was an  Australian rules footballer who played with North Melbourne in the Victorian Football League (VFL).

Notes

External links 

1916 births
2006 deaths
Australian rules footballers from Victoria (Australia)
North Melbourne Football Club players